Mesoplasma is a genus of bacteria belonging to the class Mollicutes. Mesoplasma is related to the genus Mycoplasma but differ in several respects.

Phylogeny
The currently accepted taxonomy is based on the List of Prokaryotic names with Standing in Nomenclature (LPSN) and National Center for Biotechnology Information (NCBI)

See also 
 List of bacteria genera
 List of bacterial orders

References

External links 

 bacterio.net

Bacteria genera
Mollicutes
Bacteria described in 1993